Standard Time, Vol. 6: Mr. Jelly Lord is an album by jazz trumpeter Wynton Marsalis that was released in 1999. The album peaked at number 7 on the Billboard Top Jazz Albums chart.

Reception

In a review for AllMusic, Richard S. Ginell wrote: "This is mostly gutbucket, stomping, swinging New Orleans jazz through the eyes and ears of avid students of old records -- and they have absorbed a good deal of the original raffish, joyous feeling... The results are often hilarious, and certainly instructive."

The authors of The Penguin Guide to Jazz Recordings noted that "Wynton's playing has rarely sounded so relaxed and so raw," and stated: "There is no attempt to lend these astonishing compositions any false grandeur; they have quite enough as it is."

C. Michael Bailey of All About Jazz commented: "Marsalis is an acquired taste, to be sure, often coming off as too reverent for the music, but this recording is as near a perfect and genuinely heartfelt a performance as could be expected."

Writing for Jazz Times, Willard Jenkins remarked: "the band does not address Jelly’s music as period pieces, but on Wynton's own terms; not as deconstructionist, but as reverent update. Hewing to the tradition of this music, while giving it a contemporary polish is no small feat, yet it is accomplished here with aplomb."

Writing for Burning Ambulance, Phil Freeman stated: "As an album, Mr. Jelly Lord is a lot of fun. The band is clearly having a blast digging into these tunes, with Riley setting up a stomping, clashing parade rhythm and the horns engaging in raucous polyphony and call-and-response. Marsalis is often at his best when growling through a plunger mute, and his interaction with trombonist Gordon is terrific throughout."

Track listing

Personnel

 Wynton Marsalis – trumpet
 Harry Connick, Jr. – piano
 Eric Reed – piano
 Eric Lewis – piano
 Victor Goines – clarinet, soprano saxophone, tenor saxophone
 Wessell Anderson – alto saxophone
 Danilo Pérez – piano
 Don Vappie – banjo, guitar
 Wycliffe Gordon – trombone, trumpet, tuba
 Lucien Barbarin – trombone
 Michael White – clarinet
 Reginald Veal – bass
 Herlin Riley – drums
 Jen Wyler – engineer
 Steven Epstein – producer
 Todd Whitelock – engineer

Credits adapted from AllMusic.

References

1999 albums
Wynton Marsalis albums
Columbia Records albums